Jono Broome is a British paracanoeist who has competed since the late 2000s. He won a bronze medal in the K-1 200 m A event at the 2010 ICF Canoe Sprint World Championships in Poznań.

References
2010 ICF Canoe Sprint World Championships men's K-1 200 m A results. - accessed 20 August 2010.

British male canoeists
Living people
Year of birth missing (living people)
ICF Canoe Sprint World Championships medalists in paracanoe
A classification paracanoeists
Paracanoeists of Great Britain
Place of birth missing (living people)